Daniel "Danny" Guba (born August 11, 1952) is a Filipino martial artist and a leading practitioner of Eskrima-Kali-Arnis. Guba is a 5 time World Eskrima Kali Arnis Federation (WEKAF) World Champion and the founder of his own style of Doce Pares Eskrima, namely Guba Doce Pares.

Career
Guba began his training in Eskrima in 1964 in Cebu, Philippines. Guba learned from prominent practitioners of Eskrima. From 1964 to 1986, Guba trained under Magdalino Nolasco, Filimon Canete, Dionisio and Ciriaco Canete;  from 1979 to 1988 under Bonifacio Uy; and from 1981 to 1988 under Vicente Carin.

Guba Doce Pares

Guba is the founder of Guba Doce Pares International and the highest authority of Doce Pares Eskrima in the United Kingdom and Europe. He is the head of the organisation and is currently based in London, UK.

Guba hosts full-contact single-stick sparring, double-stick sparring, corto (close range) sparring, knife-sparring and Sayaw (form) tournaments. The two major Guba Doce Pares International tournaments in the United Kingdom are 'Quest for the Best' and the 'Apex International Open' which is held every two years at SENI, the world's biggest martial arts expo, in the O2 Soccerdome and ExCeL London. Guba has also trained British, European and World Champion Rob Bailey who has gone on to establish their own Guba Doce Pares schools in the United Kingdom and worldwide.

World Filipino Martial Arts Federation (WFMAF)

As of February 2018 SGM Danny Guba is the President of the World Filipino Martial Arts Federation (WFMAF).

References

1952 births
Filipino eskrimadors
Living people